Tiberius Claudius Nero may refer to:
 Tiberius Claudius Nero (son of Caecus)
 Tiberius Claudius Nero (consul 202 BC)
 Tiberius Claudius Nero (grandfather of Tiberius Caesar)
 Tiberius Claudius Nero (father of Tiberius Caesar)
 Tiberius, formerly Tiberius Claudius Nero, Roman emperor from 14 to 37
 Claudius, formerly Tiberius Claudius Nero Germanicus, Roman emperor from 41 to 54

See also
 Claudii Nerones